Valice is a village and municipality in the Rimavská Sobota District of the Banská Bystrica Region of southern Slovakia.

External links
http://www.statistics.sk/mosmis/eng/run.html

Villages and municipalities in Rimavská Sobota District